Donall an Dúna Mac Cairteáin, Irish Poet, fl. 1720s.

A son of Jacobite poet, Liam an Dúna Mac Cairteáin (1668–1724), Donall received all his father's books upon Liam's death.

Irish poets
Irish-language poets
18th-century Irish people
People from County Antrim